California's 22nd State Assembly district is one of 80 California State Assembly districts. The district moved from the San Francisco Peninsula to the San Joaquin Valley as part of redistricting in 2022.

District profile 
The district is in the San Joaquin Valley. It is suburban and rural with a large agricultural economy base. Many citizens commute to work in the San Francisco Bay Area.  Modesto, Turlock, and Patterson are the largest communities in the district.

Election results from statewide races

List of assemblymembers 
Due to redistricting, the 22nd district has been moved around different parts of the state. The current iteration resulted from the 2020 redistricting by the California Citizens Redistricting Commission.

Election results 1992 - present

2020

2018

2016

2014

2012

2010

2008

2006

2004

2002

2000

1998

1996

1994

1992

See also 
 California State Assembly
 California State Assembly districts
 Districts in California

References

External links 
 District map from the California Citizens Redistricting Commission

22
Government of San Mateo County, California
Brisbane, California
Burlingame, California
Foster City, California
Millbrae, California
Pacifica, California
Portola Valley, California
Redwood City, California
San Bruno, California
San Carlos, California
San Mateo, California
South San Francisco, California
Government in the San Francisco Bay Area